Myxosphaera is a radiolarian genus in the Collosphaeridae. The genus may contain bioluminescent species.  It is a genus of colonial radiolarians (as opposed to solitary).

Species
The following species are known (incomplete list):
Myxosphaera coerulea Haeckel

References

Radiolarian genera
Dubiously bioluminescent organisms